Alyssa Cecere  (born 4 September 1987 in Brossard, Quebec, Canada) is a Canadian professional ice hockey player.

Biography 
Known as Chech, she began playing hockey at the age of five after her brother took in interest.

Club career

SIC 
Cecere played five years with the McGill Martlets, during which time she helped her team win three CIS championships. In 20 games with the Martlets in the 2010–11 season, she earned eight points, with two goals and six assists.

LCHF 
2011-12 was her first season with the Montreal Stars in the Canadian Hockey League. She collected 2 goals and 8 mentions of assistance, for a total of 10 points in 25 matches. Its role is more defensive. In the final of the 2012 Clarkson Cup, Cecere netted the Stars' first goal.

Honours 
Champion of the Clarkson Cup (2012)
2011-12 regular season championship in the CFSA
Three-time national women's university hockey champion
5 Quebec championships with the McGill Martlets

Real life 
Cecere worked as a teacher in the Montréal area until she was appointed an assistant coach for the Martlets women's hockey team at McGill Athletics in 2014.

References

External links
 
 Profil d'Alyssa Cecere à l'université McGill 
 Belle victoire pour Alyssa Cecere et ses coéquipières par Hélène Belzile, Hebdomadaire Rive-Sud Express publié le 4 avril 2012. 

1987 births
Living people
Canadian women's ice hockey players
Ice hockey people from Quebec
McGill Martlets ice hockey players
Les Canadiennes de Montreal players